The Parx Dash Stakes is a Listed American Thoroughbred horse race for three years old or older, over a distance of five furlongs on the turf held annually in July at Parx Casino and Racing racetrack in Bensalem, Pennsylvania.  The event currently carries a purse of $200,000.

History 
The race was inaugurated in 2011 with an attractive purse offered of $200,000 as the Parx Dash Handicap. 

In 2013 the event was upgraded to a Grade III.

The event has attracted fast sprinters from the East Coast of the US, including Ben's Cat and Pure Sensation who both won this event three times.

In 2022 the event was downgraded to Listed.

Records
Speed record: 
 5 furlongs – 54.96 - Ben's Cat  (2012)

Margins: 
  lengths – Pure Sensation (2017)

Most wins by a jockey  
 3 – Julian Pimentel  (2012, 2013, 2014)

Most wins by a trainer
 3 – Christophe Clement (2016, 2017, 2019)
 3 – King T. Leatherbury (2012, 2013, 2014)
Most wins by an owner

 3 – The Jim Stable (2012, 2013, 2014)
 3 – Patricia A. Generazio (2016, 2017, 2019)

Winners of Parx Dash Stakes – Turf Monster Stakes double

 Ben's Cat (2012)
 Pure Sensation (2017, 2019)

Winners 

Legend:

References 

Horse races in Pennsylvania
Recurring sporting events established in 2011
Turf races in the United States
Parx Casino and Racing
2011 establishments in Pennsylvania